The 2004 Dutch Open, also known by its sponsored name Priority Telecom Open, was an ATP men's tennis tournament staged on outdoor clay courts in Amersfoort, Netherlands and part of the International Series of the 2004 ATP Tour.

The tournament was held from 12 July until 18 July 2004. Fourth-seeded Martin Verkerk won his first event of the year, and the second title of his professional career.

Finals

Singles

 Martin Verkerk defeated  Fernando González 7–6(7–5), 4–6, 6–4

Doubles

 Jaroslav Levinský /  David Škoch defeated  José Acasuso /  Luis Horna 6–0, 2–6, 7–5

References

External links
ITF – Amersfoort tournament details
Singles draw
Doubles draw
Qualifying Singles draw

Dutch Open (tennis)
Dutch Open
Dutch Open (tennis)
Dutch Open (tennis), 2004